The Arizona–Texas League was a Class D level American minor league baseball league that existed for nine seasons, from 1931–32, 1937–41, 1947–50 and 1952-54. In 1951, the Arizona-Texas loop merged with the Sunset League (based primarily in California but with teams in Nevada and New Mexico) to form the Southwest International League. However, the Arizona and Texas clubs played only that one season (1951) in the new circuit before seceding and reforming the A-TL in 1952. From 1928 to 1930, it was known as the Arizona State League.

History
After the 1930 season, the Arizona State League, which began play in 1928, changed their name and evolved into the 1931 Class D Arizona–Texas League. Arizona State League president Wilford S. Sullinger remained as president of the newly named league. Former Arizona State League members Bisbee Bees, El Paso Texans, Globe Bears, Phoenix Senators and Tucson Missions continued play in the 1931 Arizona–Texas League, joined by the Nogales Internationals.

The Arizona–Texas League was the lowest level in the minor leagues, Class D, through 1939, and upgraded to Class C from 1940 onward. Its longest tenured clubs included:
 El Paso, Texas
 Bisbee and Bisbee-Douglas, Arizona
 Phoenix, Arizona
 Tucson, Arizona

The Arizona-Texas circuit also had teams in Mexico as early as 1931, although its name did not reflect this fact. Indios de Ciudad Juárez team was a member for seven years in the 1940s and 1950s. But in 1955, when the league lost its lone Texas franchise, in El Paso, its name was formally changed to the Arizona–Mexico League. In 1958, its Phoenix franchise moved all the way up to Class AAA when it received the old San Francisco Seals club after the Giants moved West. That signaled the end of the Class C Arizona–Mexico League; its final champion in 1958 was the Douglas Copper Kings, an affiliate of the Pittsburgh Pirates.

List of teams

Albuquerque, NM: Albuquerque Dons 1932; Albuquerque Cardinals 1937–1941 
Bisbee, AZ: Bisbee Bees 1931–1932; 1937–1941; Bisbee Yanks 1947 
Bisbee, AZ & Douglas, AZ: Bisbee-Douglas Miners 1948; Bisbee-Douglas Copper Kings 1949–1950; 1952–1954
Cananea, Sonora, MEX: Cananea Mineros 1954 
Chihuahua, Chihuahua, MEX: Chihuahua Dorados 1952 
Ciudad Juárez, Chihuahua, MEX: Juarez Indios 1947–1950; 1952–1954 
El Paso, TX: El Paso Texans 1931–1932; 1937–1941; 1947–1950; 1952–1954 
Globe, AZ: Globe Bears 1931 
Globe, AZ & Miami, AZ: Globe-Miami Browns 1947–1950 
Mesa, AZ: Mesa Orphans 1947 
Mexicali, Baja California, MEX: Mexicali Eagles 1953–1954 
Nogales, Sonora, MEX: Nogales Internationals 1931; Nogales Yaquis 1954 
Phoenix, AZ: Phoenix Senators 1931–1932; 1947–1950; 1952–1953; Phoenix Stars 1954
Tucson, AZ: Tucson Missions 1931; Tucson Lizards 1932; Tucson Cowboys 1937–1941; 1947–1950; 1952–1954

Champion teams

1931 – El Paso Texans
1932 – Unknown
1937 – Albuquerque Cardinals
1938 – El Paso Texans
1939 – Albuquerque Cardinals
1940 – El Paso Texans
1941 – Tucson Cowboys
1947 – Globe-Miami Browns
1948 – Globe-Miami Browns
1949 – El Paso Texans
1950 – El Paso Texans
1952 – Juarez Indios
1953 – Tucson Cowboys
1954 – Phoenix Stars

Standings & statistics

1931 to 1940
1931 Arizona–Texas League
schedule
Playoff: El Paso 5 games, Bisbee 0. 

1932 Arizona–Texas League
Phoenix disbanded May 9. The league disbanded July 24. 
 
1937 Arizona–Texas League
Playoffs: Albuquerque defeated El Paso in a one game playoff for the second half title. Finals: Albuquerque 4 games, El Paso 3. 

1938 Arizona–Texas League
Playoffs: El Paso 4 games, Bisbee 3.
 
1939 Arizona–Texas League
Playoffs: Albuquerque 4 games, Bisbee 2.
 
1940 Arizona–Texas League
Playoffs: El Paso 4 games, Tucson 3.

1941 to 1950
1941 Arizona–Texas League
schedule
Playoffs: None Scheduled 
 
1947 Arizona–Texas League
schedule
Juarez disbanded June 22 after winning the first half and was replaced by Mesa June 27. Playoffs: Tucson 2 games, Bisbee 0; Globe-Miami 2 games, Phoenix 0; Finals: Globe–Miami 3 games, Tucson 2. 

1948 Arizona–Texas League 
Playoffs: El Paso defeated Juarez in a one game playoff for third place; Globe–Miami 4 games, El Paso 2; Juarez 4 games, Tucson 1. Finals: Globe–Miami 4 games, Juarez 3. 

1949 Arizona–Texas League
schedule
Playoffs: Phoenix 4 games, Tucson 2; El Paso 4 games, Juarez 2. Finals: El Paso 4 games, Phoenix 2. 

1950 Arizona–Texas League
schedule
Playoffs: Phoenix 4 games, Juarez 2; El Paso 4 games, Bisbee-Douglas 2. Finals: El Paso 4 games, Phoenix 2.

1952 to 1954
1952 Arizona–Texas League
Playoffs: None Scheduled. 

1953 Arizona–Texas League
Playoffs: None Scheduled. 

1954 Arizona–Texas League
Playoffs: None Scheduled.

References
 Johnson, Lloyd and Wolff, Miles, ed., The Encyclopedia of Minor League Baseball. Durham, North Carolina: Baseball America, 1997.

External links
Baseball Reference – Arizona–Texas League Encyclopedia and History

Baseball leagues in Arizona
Defunct minor baseball leagues in the United States
Baseball leagues in Texas
1931 establishments in North America
1954 disestablishments in North America
Sports leagues established in 1931
Sports leagues disestablished in 1954
Defunct baseball leagues in Mexico